Dobrava-Belgrade orthohantavirus (DOBV), also known as Dobrava virus, is an enveloped, single-stranded, negative-sense RNA virus species of Old World Orthohantavirus. It is one of several species of Hantavirus that is the causative agent of severe Hantavirus hemorrhagic fever with renal syndrome. It was first isolated in 1985 from a yellow-necked mouse (Apodemus flavicollis) found in the village of Dobrava, southeastern Slovenia. It was subsequently isolated in striped field mice in Russia and other parts of Eastern Europe. It has also been found in Germany but the reservoir host there is unknown.

Phylogeny
Four genotypes are described:
 Dobrava, observed mostly in southeastern Europe
 Kurkino, observed throughout northern and eastern Europe
 Saaremaa, observed in Estonia and Slovakia
 Sochi, observed in the Black Sea coast region of Russia

Disease
Clinical presentation varies between the four genotypes. Dobrava is the most virulent, with a case-fatality rate (CFR) of 10 to 12%, followed by Sochi, which has a CFR greater than 6%, then Kurkino, which has a CFR 0.3% to 0.9%, and lastly Saaremaa, which seems to mainly be subclinical as illness has not been reported despite a relatively high rate of seropositivity.

Natural reservoir
The four genotypes each have their own natural reservoir:
 Dobrava: Yellow-necked mouse
 Kurkino: Striped field mouse
 Saaremaa: Striped field mouse
 Sochi: Black  Sea field mouse

See also
 Hantavirus vaccine
 Sangassou virus
 Conjunctival suffusion
 List of cutaneous conditions
 Sweating sickness, which may have been caused by a hantavirus
 1993 Four Corners hantavirus outbreak

References

External links
 Sloan Science and Film / Short Films / Muerto Canyon by Jen Peel 29 minutes
 "Hantaviruses, with emphasis on Four Corners Hantavirus" by Brian Hjelle, M.D., Department of Pathology, School of Medicine, University of New Mexico
 CDC's Hantavirus Technical Information Index page
 Viralzone: Hantavirus
 Virus Pathogen Database and Analysis Resource (ViPR): Bunyaviridae
 Occurrences and deaths in North and South America

Viral diseases
Hantaviridae
Hemorrhagic fevers
Rodent-carried diseases